NCAA Season 93 is the 2017–18 collegiate athletic year of the National Collegiate Athletic Association in the Philippines. It is hosted by San Sebastian College-Recoletos (SSC-R).

Sports calendar
This is the tentative calendar of events of the NCAA Season 93. The list includes the tournament host schools and the venues.

First semester

Second semester

Basketball

 
The NCAA Season 93 basketball tournaments of the NCAA Season 93 commenced on July 8, 2017 at the Mall of Asia Arena, Pasay.

Seniors' tournament

Elimination round

Bracket

Juniors' tournament

Elimination round

Bracket 
*Game went into overtime

Volleyball

The volleyball tournament of NCAA Season 93 started on January 4, 2018 at the Filoil Flying V Arena. San Sebastian College-Recoletos is the event host. All teams will participate in an elimination round which is a round robin tournament. The top four teams qualify in the semifinals, where the unbeaten team bounces through the finals, with a thrice-to-beat advantage, higher-seeded team possesses the twice-to-beat advantage, or qualify to the first round. The winners qualify to the finals.

Men's tournament

Elimination round

Final round

Women's tournament

Elimination round

Final round

Juniors' tournament

Elimination round

Final round

Chess

Seniors tournament

 Team standings

 Match-up results

Scores

Juniors tournament

 Team standings

 Match-up results

Scores

Badminton

Seniors tournament

Event host in boldface

 Match-up results

Scores

Women's tournament

Event host in boldface

 Match-up results

Scores

Juniors tournament

Event host in boldface

 Match-up results

Scores

Swimming

Men's tournament
Season host is boldfaced.

Women's tournament
Season host is boldfaced.

Juniors' tournament
Season host is boldfaced.

See also
UAAP Season 80

Broadcast coverage
Play-by-play:
Andrei Felix 
Martin Javier
Anton Roxas

Analysts (Basketball)
Mikee Reyes
Renren Ritualo
Jio Jalalon
Topex Robinson
Jimmy Alapag

Courtside Reporters:
Sarah Carlos
Roxanne Montealegre
Ana Ramsey
Ceej Tantengco

Previous Courtside Reporter of NCAA
Gelliemae Obeña
Princess Legaspi

References

2017 in multi-sport events
2018 in multi-sport events
2017 in Philippine sport
National Collegiate Athletic Association (Philippines) seasons